Şah Sultan may refer to:
 Şah Sultan (daughter of Bayezid II): (1474–1506) Ottoman princess; 
Şah Sultan (daughter of Selim I): (1507–1572) Ottoman princess;
 Şah Sultan (daughter of Selim II): (1544–1577) Ottoman princess;
 Şah Sultan (daughter of Mehmed III): (1595–1647) Ottoman princess; 
 Şah Sultan (daughter of Mustafa III): (1761–1803) Ottoman princess.